Branched pathways, also known as branch points (not to be confused with the mathematical branch point), are a common pattern found in metabolism. This is where an intermediate species is chemically made or transformed by multiple enzymatic processes. This is contrasted by linear pathways, which only have one enzymatic reaction producing a species and one enzymatic reaction consuming the species.

Branched pathways are present in numerous metabolic reactions, including glycolysis, and the synthesis of lysine, glutamine, and penicillin. Further examples of branched pathways can be found in the production of aromatic amino acids. 

In general, a single branch may have  producing branches and  consuming branches.

At steady-state when  the consumption and production rates must be equal:

One way to investigate the properties of a branched pathway is to carry out computer simulations or to look at the control coefficients for flux and species concentrations using metabolic control analysis.

Simple branch pathway 

Shown to the right is a simple branched pathway with one producing reaction and two consuming reactions.  If we assume the pathway is at steady state then conservation of mass means that:

Following the flux summation theorem and the connectivity theorem the following system of equations can be produced for the simple pathway.

Equations can be paired off, but with three unknown flux control coefficients the system of equations cannot be solved. To produce the third equation the steady state concentration thought experiment is used.

Steady State Concentration Thought Experiment 
The steady-state concentration thought experiment follows a series of steps.

This will decrease  and increase  through relief of product inhibition.
 Since  and  have not changed, .

Following these assumptions two sets of equations are produced. The flux branch point theorems and the concentration branch point theorems.

Derivation 
From these assumptions the following system equation can be produced:

Because  and, assuming that the flux rates are directly related to the enzyme concentration thus, the elasticities, equal one, the local equations are:

Conservation of mass dictates  since  then . Substitution eliminates the  term from the system equation:

Dividing out  results in:

 and  can be substituted by the fractional rates giving:

Rearrangement yields the final form of the first flux branch point theorem:

Similar derivations result in two more flux branch point theorems, and the three concentration branch point theorems.

Flux branch point theorems

Concentration branch point theorems 

Using these theorems plus flux summation and connectivity theorems values for the concentration and flux control coefficients can be determined using linear algebra.

Control properties of a branch pathway 

The derivations above allow the properties of a simple branch to be investigated.

That is,  acquires proportional influences over its own flux, . Since
Because of the flux summation theorem and the fact that , it means that the remaining two coefficients must be equal and opposite in value. Since  is negative,  must be positive. This also means that in this situation, there can be more than one Rate-limiting step (biochemistry) in a pathway.

Depending on the values of the elasticities, it is possible for the control coefficients in a branched
system to greatly exceed one.

See also

 Control coefficient (biochemistry) 
 Elasticity coefficient
 Metabolic control analysis

References 

Metabolic pathways